Eutorna is a genus of gelechioid moths.

Species
Eutorna annosa Meyrick, 1936 (from China)
Eutorna caryochroa Meyrick, 1889 (from New Zealand)
Eutorna diaula Meyrick, 1906 (from Australia)
Eutorna diluvialis Meyrick, 1913 (from Congo, Madagascar & South Africa)
Eutorna epicnephes Meyrick, 1906 (from Australia)
Eutorna eurygramma Meyrick, 1906 (from Australia)
Eutorna generalis Meyrick, 1921 (from Australia and Java)
Eutorna inornata Philpott, 1927 (from New Zealand)
Eutorna insidiosa Meyrick, 1910 (from India & Japan)
Eutorna intonsa Meyrick, 1906 (from Australia)
Eutorna leonidi Lvovsky, 1979 (from Japan & Sibiria)
Eutorna leptographa Meyrick, 1906 (from Australia)
Eutorna pabulicola Meyrick, 1906 (from Australia)
Eutorna phaulocosma Meyrick, 1906 (from Australia & New Zealand)
Eutorna plumbeola Turner, 1947 (from Australia)
Eutorna polismatica Meyrick, 1931 (from Japan)
Eutorna punctinigrella Viette, 1955 (from Madagascar)
Eutorna rubida (Turner, 1919) (from Australia)
Eutorna spintherias Meyrick, 1906 (from Australia)
Eutorna symmorpha Meyrick, 1889 (from New Zealand)
Eutorna tricasis Meyrick, 1906 (from Australia)

References

"Eutorna Meyrick, 1889" at Markku Savela's Lepidoptera and Some Other Life Forms
images at boldsystems.org
Meyrick, 1889
jpmoths.org

 
Depressariinae